Bad Dreams is the second studio album by Canadian hip hop group Swollen Members on Battleaxe Records, released in 2001. Bad Dreams was a progression of the sound the group expressed on Balance leaning more towards the mainstream.  "Take It Back" was the album's first single though the record didn't take off until the second single, "Fuel Injected" was released. "Fuel Injected" turned the underground rap group into household names overnight. The follow-up single "Bring It Home" was equally successful peaking at #3 on the Canadian Singles Chart, helping the record attain Platinum certification in Canada. The presence of Moka Only on the group's two biggest singles prompted him to join the group from 2002 to 2005. The 19th and 20th tracks are bonus tracks that appear on the 2002 reissue only. The reissue also sports an alternate cover similar to the original release. The original album also contains a hidden remix of "Take It Back" produced by Joey Chavez that appears after the end of "High Road". Kludge magazine listed Bad Dreams as one of the 25 best albums of 2001. Bad Dreams was the seventh-best selling rap album in Canada in 2002 and the best-selling rap album of the year in Canada by a Canadian rap artist.

Track listing

In popular culture
The song "Fuel Injected" was featured in the video game Mat Hoffman's Pro BMX 2.
The song "Deep End" was featured on the video games Triple Play 2002, NBA Live 2002 and SSX 3 (the Utah Saints remix).

Year-end charts

References 

2001 albums
Swollen Members albums
Albums produced by Evidence (musician)
Albums produced by Saukrates
Albums produced by the Alchemist (musician)
Juno Award for Rap Recording of the Year recordings